Uganda requires its residents to register their motor vehicles and display vehicle registration plates.

Uganda Government vehicles are written with red paint on a yellow/orange or white background. They all start with UG, followed by a number number finally a letter code to identify the ministry, department, or agency. 

Government vehicles are identified with the following codes:

 A- Ministry of Agriculture, Animal Industry and Fisheries,  

 B- Electoral Commission & Human Rights Commission  
 C- Office of the President / State House of Uganda 
 D- Ministry of Defence and Veteran Affairs 
 E- Ministry of Education and Sports 
 F- Ministry of Finance, Planning and Economic Development 
 G-Ministry of Internal Affairs 
 H- Parliament of Uganda/ Office of the Auditor General 
 I- Ministry of Ministry of East African Community Affairs 
 J- Ministry of Judiciary and Constitutional Affairs 
 K- Ministry of Energy and Mineral Development 
 L- Ministry of Lands, Housing and Urban Development 
 M- Ministry of Health 
 N- Ministry of Information and Communications Technology 
 O- Ministry of Science, Technology and Innovation 
 Q- Ministry of Public Service 
 R- Ministry of Local Government 
 S- Ministry of Water and Environment 
 T- Uganda Ministry of Tourism, Wildlife and Antiquities 
 U- Uganda Prisons Service 
 W- Ministry of Works and Transport 
 X- Ministry of Foreign Affairs 
 Y- Ministry of Gender, Labour and Social Development 
 Z- Office of the Prime Minister  

There are three main motor vehicle licensing bodies; Uganda Revenue Authority (URA), Chief Mechanical Engineer (CME) and the Military Licensing Board (MLB)

References

Uganda
Transport in Uganda
Uganda transport-related lists